Lars-Eric Gustafsson (also Gustavsson; born 6 June 1935) is a retired Swedish rower who won a bronze medal in the coxed fours at the 1959 European Championships. He competed in the coxed fours and in the eights at the 1960 Summer Olympics, but failed to reach the finals.

References

1935 births
Living people
Swedish male rowers
Olympic rowers of Sweden
Rowers at the 1960 Summer Olympics
European Rowing Championships medalists
Sportspeople from Gothenburg